Nikolskoye is a rural locality (a village) in Zhityovskoye Rural Settlement, Syamzhensky District, Vologda Oblast, Russia. The population was 15 as of 2002.

Geography 
Nikolskoye is located 26 km southeast of Syamzha (the district's administrative centre) by road. Levinskaya is the nearest rural locality.

References 

Rural localities in Syamzhensky District